KBHE may refer to:

 KBHE-FM, a radio station (89.3 FM) licensed to Rapid City, South Dakota, United States
 KBHE-TV, a television station (channel 26) licensed to Rapid City, South Dakota, United States